Kattoor is a village near Kozhencherry on the southern side of Pamba river on the way from Kozhencherry to Ranni in Cherukole Panchayath in Pathanamthitta District which is part of the state of Kerala, India. Kattoor is situated 5 km east of Kozhencherry town and 9 km west of Ranni town.

Geography

Educational Institutions in Kattoor
 N.S.S High School Kattoor
 N.S.S T.T.I Cherukole

Neighbouring places
 Vazhakunnam
 Kacherypadi
 Kalapamon
 Chanamankal
 Kilianikkal
 Puthamon
 Plamthottam Perumethupadi
 Vayalathala
 Keekozhoor
 Ayroor
 Melukara

Nearest Towns
 Kozhencherry
 Ranni
 Pathanamthitta

References

External links

Villages in Pathanamthitta district